Gryazev-Shipunov may refer to:

 Gryazev-Shipunov GSh-6-23, a Soviet 23 mm 6-barreled rotary cannon
 Gryazev-Shipunov GSh-6-30, a Soviet 30 mm 6-barreled rotary cannon
 Gryazev-Shipunov GSh-23, a Soviet twin-barreled 23 mm autocannon
 Gryazev-Shipunov GSh-23L, variant with muzzle brake
 Gryazev-Shipunov GSh-30-1, a Soviet single-barreled 30 mm autocannon
 Gryazev-Shipunov GSh-30-2, a Soviet twin-barreled 30 mm autocannon
 Gryazev-Shipunov GSh-18, a Soviet 9 mm semi-automatic pistol

See also

 Glagolev-Shipunov-Gryazev GShG-7.62, a Soviet 7.62 mm quad-barreled rotary machine gun
 
 
 List of Russian weaponry makers
 List of aircraft weapons
 List of autocannon

KBP Instrument Design Bureau products